Hugh Dane (October 21, 1942 – May 16, 2018) was an American character actor. He was best known for playing Hank the security guard on the television sitcom The Office from 2005 to 2013.

Acting career 
Dane's professional acting career began with a role in the 1989 video game, It Came from the Desert before moving on to his first television role in a two-part episode of Hunter.  In 1991, Dane acted in his first film role as a corrections officer in the crime-thriller Ricochet.  In the following years, Dane played small roles in popular television series' such as The Fresh Prince of Bel-Air, Hangin' with Mr. Cooper, Boy Meets World, Martin, Friends, Sister, Sister, Monk and Girl Meets World.

Dane received the most recognition for his role as Hank, the head of security, in The Office. He also played the role of a judge in Netflix's Wet Hot American Summer: First Day of Camp.

In 1999, Dane returned to film, acting in such movies as Restraining Order, Joy Ride, Reflections: A Story of Redemption, Ralph & Stanley, Beautiful Dreamer, For Heaven's Sake, StarStruck, and Bridesmaids.

Death
Dane died on May 16, 2018, at the age of 75 from pancreatic cancer.

Filmography

Film

Television

References

External links

1942 births
2018 deaths
American male television actors
African-American male actors
20th-century American male actors
21st-century American male actors
Deaths from pancreatic cancer
People from Arizona
20th-century African-American people
21st-century African-American people